Suankularb Wittayalai Nonthaburi School (S.K.N) is the second school affiliated with Suankularb Wittayalai School. The school is a secondary school for grades 7 through 12 in Thailand (Mathayom 1 to Mathayom 6)  under the management of Dr.yanyalak Surawut, the 90th principal of the school. It is located at 51/4 No. 5 Tiwanon Road, Pak kret Sub-district, Pak kret District, Nonthaburi.

Suankularb Wittayalai Nonthaburi School is a government school and has more than 4,300 students (2017) with over 300 teachers and staff. As the school's location borders the districts of Mueang Pathum Thani of Pathum Thani Province, Don Mueang and Lak Si of Bangkok, Mueang Nonthaburi and Bang Bua Thong of Nonthaburi Province, it attracts students not only from Nonthaburi province but Pathum Thani province, Ayuttaya province and Bangkok as well. Suankularb Wittayalai Nonthaburi School covers approximately 10 acres of land in Nonthaburi Province (north of Bangkok). The school is situated in Pakkret district, Nonthaburi province.

History 
Suankularb Wittayalai Nonthaburi School is an extra-large secondary school for boys and girls situated in Pakkred, Nonthaburi Province. The school was founded on March 30, 1978 by Mr. Pasuk Maneejak. It was originally named Suankularb Wittayalai 2 (Pasuk Maneejak) in honour of the person that donated the land, Mr. Pasuk and Mrs. Ngek Maneejak. During its construction, the students enrolled in this school were temporarily sent to other schools. The boys were sent to Suankularb Wittayalai School in Bangkok and the girls were sent to Satri Nonthaburi School.

In 1979, the Ministry of Education changed the school's name from Suankularb Wittayalai 2 to Suankularb Wittayalai Nonthaburi School. Not long after that, HRH Princess Sirindhorn named four buildings after the initials of her name as ST1, ST2, ST3, and ST4 respectively. Sirindharalai meeting hall was also named after her. The buildings were inaugurated twice by the princess herself on August 13, 1981 and November 9, 1992. On July 11, 2012, the Princess came to inaugurate King Rama V monument.

Through the collaborative efforts of the school board, faculty and staff, Suankularb Wittayalai Nonthaburi School is recognized locally and internationally.

Study Programs

Lower Secondary (Grade 7–9) 
 Mini English Programme (MEP - Special Programme)
 Math and Science Programme(SM - Special Programme)
 Intensive Math and Science (Regular Programme)

Upper Secondary (Grade 10–12) 
 Mini English Programme (MEP - Special Programme)
 Math and Science in English (SME - Special Programme)
 Math and Science in Thai (SMT - Special Programme)
 Math and Science (Regular Programme)
 Mathematics and English (Regular Programme)
 Chinese/Japanese/French (Regular Programme)

School symbol 
The symbol of Suankularb Wittayalai Nonthaburi School is a book with a ruler, pen and pencil put in the book. On the cover of the book is a royal headdress (the "Pra Kiew" symbol) and royal cypher initials. On the right side, there is a bouquet of roses. To the left of the book, a ribbon tying the bouquet of roses with the name of the school written on it.

Sports facilities 
 stadium
 football field
 gymnasium
 indoor swimming pool
 basketball court

Other facilities 
 school auditorium
 canteen
 souvenir shop
 small recreation park
 dormitory for school staff
 dormitory for school varsity students: football, volleyball

Traditional 
Suankularb Wittayalai Nonthaburi School has many traditional events, including academic Paj chim Day and orientation Day

On orientation day all matayom 6 students welcome first-year students to the school. This day invite director to give a speech, and has a souvenir to give to matayom 1 students.

On Paj chim day is the last day at the school. All matayom 6 students come and dinner together with their teachers. After the dinner each class of matayom 6 sit together in a circle and make a short speech. At the end of the event they sing a “Chompoo-Fah ar lai” song together.

Director of Suankularb Wittayalai Nonthaburi School

Departments 
 Department of Thai Language
 Department of Vocational Technology
 Department of Mathematics
 Department of Science
 Department of Arts
 Department of Physical Education, Health & Hygiene
 Department of Social Studies
 Department of Foreign Languages

Fact 
 Area: 10 acres
 Abbreviation: S.K.N
 Type: Government Secondary School (194 teachers 4,735 students)

Notes 
 Foundation Suankularb Wittayalai Nonthaburi School
 Short History of Suankularb Wittayalai Nonthaburi School
 Suankularb Wittayalai Nonthaburi Alumni Association
 Public Relations Officer of Suankularb Wittayalai Nonthaburi School

External links 
 Photos on Facebook
 Videos on YouTube

References 

Schools in Thailand